Marietta Barovier (fl. 1496), was a Venetian glass artist.

She was the daughter of the glass artist Angelo Barovièr of Murano, inventor of the cristallo glass. Marietta Barovier and her brother, Giovanni, inherited her family workshop in 1460.  She managed the workshop in collaboration with her brother. Of fourteen specialist glass painters (pictori) documented between 1443 and 1516, she and Elena de Laudo were the only women.

Her work can not be clearly identified. She is known to have been the artist behind a particular glass design from Venetian Murano, the glass bead called rosette or chevron bead, in 1480.  In 1487 she was noted to have been given the privilege to construct a special kiln (sua fornace parrula) for making "her beautiful, unusual and not blown works".

She is noted in 1496, in an inventory with her brother about a group of enamelled glasses.

References 

 Giovanni Sarpellon, Miniature di vetro. Murrine 1838–1924, Venezia, Arsenale editrice, 1990, .
 Meredith Small, Inventing the World: Venice and the Transformation of Western Civilization

Italian glass artists
Women glass artists
15th-century Venetian people
15th-century women artists
15th-century Venetian women
Republic of Venice artists
16th-century Italian artists